Hicks Lumber Company Store is a historic commercial building located at Roslyn in Nassau County, New York. It was built in 1920 and is a two-story, frame building with Colonial Revival style detailing.  It has a low-pitched hipped roof and projecting, two-story portico.  The first story features original, projecting display windows.

It was added to the National Register of Historic Places on October 2, 1986, and is also located next door to the Roslyn Grist Mill, which was also added the National Register of Historic Places on the same day.

References

Roslyn, New York
Commercial buildings on the National Register of Historic Places in New York (state)
Colonial Revival architecture in New York (state)
Commercial buildings completed in 1920
Buildings and structures in Nassau County, New York
National Register of Historic Places in North Hempstead (town), New York
Individually listed contributing properties to historic districts on the National Register in New York (state)
1920 establishments in New York (state)